Field Medic is the stage name of American lo-fi musician Kevin Patrick Sullivan.

History
He began releasing music with his older brother Sean in 2009, initially as Westwood & Willow and then with drummer Andrew Skewes-Cox as Rin Tin Tiger. He debuted as Field Medic with his first EP titled Crushed Pennies. In 2015, Sullivan released his first full-length album titled Light Is Gone. In 2017, Sullivan released an EP titled  if i shout that the revolutions in my blind heart have left me on the mend, would i still have to surrender to the tides to exorcise this possession? on Bandcamp. Also in 2017, Sullivan signed to Run for Cover Records and released his first album on the label titled Songs From The Sunroom. Sullivan's song "do a little dope" was featured on Alternative Press's "20 songs you need to hear this week" list.

Field Medic was featured on a Green Day tribute album singing the song "2000 Light Years Away".

Discography

Studio Albums

EPs
Crushed Pennies (self-released, 2013)
fuck you grim reaper (self-released, 2014)
Me, My Gibberish, & The Moon (self-released, 2015)
P E G A S U S T H O T Z (self-released, 2015)
That Beer Called Becks Reminds Me of a Haiku I Wrote (self-released, 2016)
If I Shout That the Revolutions in My Blind Heart Have Left Me on the Mend, Would I Still Have to Surrender to the Tides to Exorcise This Possession? (self-released, 2017)
boy from my dream (Run For Cover, 2018)
little place (self-released, 2018)
plunge deep golden knife (self-released, 2021)

Singles
"fuck these foolz that are making valencia street unchill and ruining the mission for everyone that lives there" (2016)
"uuu" (2016)
"flash tattoos" (2017)
"let freedom ring 2" (2018)
"henna tattoo" (2019)
"used 2 be a romantic" (2019)
"the bottle’s my lover, she’s just my friend" (2019)
"-h-o-u-s-e-k-e-y-z-" (2020)

References

Run for Cover Records artists
Living people
1991 births